Jay-Dee Geusens (born 5 March 2002) is a Belgian football player. He plays for Genk.

Club career
He made his Belgian First Division A debut for Genk on 26 September 2021 in a game against Seraing.

References

External links
 

2002 births
Living people
Belgian footballers
Belgium youth international footballers
Association football midfielders
K.R.C. Genk players
Belgian Pro League players
Jong Genk players
Challenger Pro League players